Marco Brown (c. 1927/1928 – 11 August 2022) was a Jamaican politician.

Biography
Brown served as a member of the Parliament of Jamaica for Saint James Southern from 1980 to 1989, representing the Jamaica Labour Party. He also served as Minister of Tourism from 1980 to 1983.

Brown died from COVID-19, at the age of 94.

References

1920s births
2022 deaths
Year of birth uncertain
Deaths from the COVID-19 pandemic in Jamaica
Tourism ministers of Jamaica
People from Saint James Parish, Jamaica
Members of the House of Representatives of Jamaica
Jamaica Labour Party politicians
20th-century Jamaican politicians